The Ministry of Agriculture and Irrigation of Somalia (MOAIOS) is a ministry responsible for Agriculture in Somalia. The three broad areas of scope for the Ministry are agriculture, food processing and co-operation. The current Minister of Agriculture is Dr. Said Hussein Iid.

Background
During the Siad Barre era this ministry was referred to as the Department of Natural Resources. The longest serving minister of this department was Abdirahman Shagahle.

Agriculture is the principal source of livelihood for more than half population of Somalia. Agriculture provides the bulk of wage goods required by non-agriculture sectors and most of the raw materials for the industries sector. Somalia is a largely agrarian economy, It accounts for about 65% of the GDP and employs 65% of the workforce. Livestock alone contributes about 40% to GDP and more than 50% of export earnings.

In December 2014, the Ministry of Agriculture announced that it would commence a new water management project on the Shabelle River in 2015 in order to assist small scale cultivators. The initiative will in part see additional water channels dug so as to more effectively control river flows on farms.

See also
 Agriculture in Somalia

References

Agriculture
Agriculture in Somalia
Somalia
Agricultural organizations based in Africa